The Yankee Air Museum is an aviation museum located at Willow Run Airport in Van Buren Township, Michigan. The museum has a small fleet of flying aircraft and a collection of static display aircraft outdoors.

History

The Yankee Air Force Inc. was founded in 1981 to pursue these goals:
 To preserve a part of Michigan's extensive aviation history.
 To acquire one of the original USAAF hangars and restore it to its original condition.
 To obtain a B-24 Liberator built at the Ford Willow Run plant, site of the museum.

The Yankee Air Force previously operated four divisions in addition to its home base:
 Saginaw Valley at Saginaw County H.W. Browne Airport in Michigan
 Wurtsmith Division at Wurtsmith Air Force Base in Michigan
 Northeast Division at Essex County Airport in New Jersey
 Florida Division in Florida

2004 fire

On the night of October 9, 2004, the Yankee Air Museum's hangar on the northeast side of Willow Run Airport (KYIP) burned down. The B-17, B-25 and C-47 were saved through heroic efforts by museum volunteers. The Stinson was at another hangar. Everything else inside the hangar was destroyed, including the original prototype North American YOV-10A Bronco, Waco CG-4A Glider, a former Thunderbirds Republic F-105, Aero L-39, Link Trainer, artifacts, spare parts, tools, and the Museum's library.

Rebuilding plans were underway within days and the museum's fundraising arm, the Michigan Aerospace Foundation, worked to replace the lost facility with a new, bigger, state-of-the-art aviation museum and aerospace facility. Ground was broken for a new museum building in April 2007. In 2008, the museum changed from a membership club to a director-driven organization with an 11-member board.

In 2009, the museum purchased a building from the Michigan Institute of Aviation and Technology (MIAT), on D Street to the east of the airfield, intending it as the new home of the museum collection.

In summer 2010, the museum opened the David and Andrea Robertson Education Center in a 1938 schoolhouse that had been moved from another part of the Willow Run complex. This had been the officers' club for the USAAF detachments stationed at Willow Run during the war, and was apparently the schoolhouse for the boys living at Henry Ford's Willow Run Farm (a social experiment that used the Willow Run site in 1939 and 1940 before the airfield and industrial complex were ever conceived).

The museum reopened to the public on October 10, 2010, six years to the day after the fire. This allowed the museum to vacate Hangar Two, which was condemned by the Wayne County Airport Authority.

The museum became a Smithsonian Affiliate in July 2011.

Move to Willow Run bomber plant
In April 2013, Yankee Air Museum and RACER Trust, owner of the former General Motors Willow Run plant, announced a plan for Yankee Air Museum to acquire a  portion of the factory, contingent upon the museum raising the funds necessary to preserve and secure their proposed portion of the facility. The museum would consolidate operations scattered on various parcels at Willow Run Airport into the 1941 landmark, designed by Albert Kahn, with the trust seeking to clear the remainder of the plant for redevelopment. The plant was used during World War II to manufacture B-24 bombers.

The campaign to save a portion of Willow Run for the Yankee Air Museum is called SaveTheBomberPlant.org, and is centered on a fundraising website by the same name.

After extending the fundraising deadline to Oct. 1, and then to Nov. 1, 2013, on October 26, 2013, RACER Trust and the Yankee Air Museum again reached a new, and final, deadline extension agreement. The final deadline to raise the funds necessary to preserve a portion of the Willow Run plant for the Yankee Air Museum was May 1, 2014.

At the time of the May 1, 2014 deadline, the Yankee Air Museum had raised over $7 million of its original $8 million fundraising goal, which was enough to enable the trust to move forward and sign a purchase agreement with Yankee, with the actual purchase expected to be finalized in late summer or fall of 2014. The majority of the $8 million fundraising goal reflects separation costs to make the preserved portion of the plant viable as a standalone structure.

The remaining portion of the Willow Run complex, which includes over 95% of the historic building, has been sold to Walbridge, Inc., for redevelopment as a connected vehicle research and test facility. RACER Trust will demolish this portion of the building prior to turning the property over to Walbridge. Preparations for demolition of Willow Run Assembly facility, with the exception of the portion that the Yankee Air Museum is campaigning to save, were well underway as of August 2014, with much of the building already demolished.

In October 2014 the museum announced that it is changing its name to the National Museum of Aviation and Technology at Historic Willow Run.

With the planned decommissioning of Hangar 1, the museum was forced to find a new home for its flying collection. After initially considering a location adjacent to the Bomber Plant hangars, a site on the east side of the airport was selected for the Roush Aeronautics Center.

Collection
It is also home to Yankee Air Museum staff and volunteers and has meeting rooms and banquet facilities for rent, machine shops and storage space for the museum collection. An outside area next to the museum is the new home of the air park.

From 2007 until August 2011, the Yankee Air Museum's flyable aircraft were hangared at the Township Airport at Grosse Ile, Michigan.

Airworthy

 Boeing PB-1G Flying Fortress 77255 Yankee Lady – It is painted as a B-17G with its original assigned USAAF serial number of 44-85829.
 North American B-25D Mitchell 43-3634 Rosie's Reply (formerly Yankee Warrior) – It flew 8 combat missions over Italy.
 Douglas TC-47D Skytrain 44-76716 "Hairless Joe" 
 WACO Classic Aircraft YMF-5C F5C-049
 Bell UH-1 Iroquois "Greyhound" 66-01126
 Ford 4-AT-B Trimotor 42

Aircraft on display

 Boeing B-52D Stratofortress 55-0677
 SPAD S.XIII 4523 – Replica
 Stinson Reliant I FB724
 Antonov An-2R 1G 211-41
 Cessna O-2 Skymaster 67-21416
 Consolidated PB4Y-2G Privateer, 59876
 De Havilland Canada DHC-4 Caribou 2
 Douglas A-4C Skyhawk 148543
 Douglas SBD-3 Dauntless 06626
 Lockheed EC-121K Warning Star 141311
 Lockheed T-33B 58-0492
 Martin RB-57A Canberra 52-1426
 McDonnell NF-101B Voodoo 56-0235
 McDonnell Douglas F-4C Phantom II 63-7555
 North American F-86L Sabre 53-1060
 North American F-100C Super Sabre 54-1785
 Republic F-84F Thunderstreak 51-9501
 Republic RF-84F Thunderflash 52-7421

Gliders

 Franklin PS-2
 Schweizer TG-3 42-52948
 LET L-13 Blaník

References

External links

 

Aerospace museums in Michigan
Military and war museums in Michigan
Museums in Wayne County, Michigan
Willow Run Airport
Museums established in 1981
1981 establishments in Michigan